The Australasian Performing Right Association Awards of 1988 (generally known as APRA Awards) are a series of awards held in 1988. The APRA Music Awards were presented by Australasian Performing Right Association (APRA) and the Australasian Mechanical Copyright Owners Society (AMCOS).

Awards 

Only winners are noted

See also 

 Music of Australia

References

External links 

 APRA official website

1988 in Australian music
1988 music awards
APRA Awards